

Billy Stockman Tjapaltjarri, (c. 1927, in Ilpitirri near Mount Denison,- September 2015) was one of Australia's best-known artists of the Western Desert Art Movement, Papunya Tula.

Tjapaltjarri's mother was killed in the Coniston Massacre in the year 1928 and his father was away from the camp hunting and survived. Billy was raised on Napperby Station by his auntie, the mother of Clifford Possum Tjapaltjarri. In the 1960s he was working as a cook at Papunya when many of the Pintupi people were brought in from the west. Like Clifford, he began his artistic career carving wooden animals for the arts and crafts marketplace. He is credited with being one of the men who painted the Honey Ant Dreaming on the wall of the Papunya School at Geoff Bardon's request. He was, in the 1970s, one of the first chairmen of Papunya Tula Pty Ltd.

Tjapaltjarri later moved west to Ilili, a pioneer in the country camp movement, although in his later years he has spent much time in Alice Springs. He travelled to New York City in 1988 for the opening of the "Dreamings" show at the Asia Society and, along with Michael Nelson Jagamarra, created a sand painting as part of the exhibition.

Collections
Tjapaltjarri's works are in national collections in Australia:
National Gallery of Australia, Canberra, Australia
National Gallery of Victoria, Melbourne, Australia
Art Gallery of South Australia, Adelaide, Australia
Kluge-Ruhe Aboriginal Art Collection, University of Virginia, Charlottesville, United States

See also
Coniston massacre

References

Further reading
'The Tjulkurra': Billy Stockman Tjapaltjarri, 

1920s births
2015 deaths
Australian Aboriginal artists
Artists from the Northern Territory